Somatochlora kennedyi, or Kennedy's emerald, is a species of emerald dragonfly in the family Corduliidae. It is found in North America.

The IUCN conservation status of Somatochlora kennedyi is "LC", least concern, with no immediate threat to the species' survival. The population is stable.

References

Further reading

 

Corduliidae
Articles created by Qbugbot
Insects described in 1918